C.A.H.S. Stadium is a multi-use stadium in Charlotte Amalie, United States Virgin Islands. Stadium is owned by the Charlotte Amalie High School (C.A.H.S.). It is currently used mostly for soccer matches and athletics competitions.

References 

Soccer venues in the United States Virgin Islands
Athletics (track and field) venues in the United States Virgin Islands
1969 establishments in the United States Virgin Islands
Sports venues completed in 1969